Pasărea Rock (English: "The Rock Bird") is a Romanian rock supergroup formed in February 2014, in Bucharest, Romania by three former members of the legendary band Transsylvania Phoenix: Mircea Baniciu (lead vocals), Josef Kappl (bass), and Ovidiu Lipan (drums). The first line-up included another Transsylvania Phoenix member — Cristi Gram on lead guitar — along with Vlady Cnejevici on keyboards and Teo Boar on guitar. Later, they were replaced by Sorin Voinea (keyboards) and Nicu Patoi (lead guitar). 

The band's sound is a fusion between modern rock and traditional folk music, along with symphonic elements. Most of the new songs are composed by Josef Kappl; the lyrics are written mainly by Florin Dumitrescu. The setlist of Pasărea Rock also includes a few songs borrowed from Transsylvania Phoenix repertory and from Mircea Baniciu's solo career. In September 2016, Pasărea Rock released its first full-length album: Legenda (The Legend). In December 2020, founding member Mircea Baniciu is replaced by Codruț Croitoru.

Band members 
 Josef Kappl – bass guitar, keyboards, vocals, songwriter, leader (since February 2014)
 Ovidiu Lipan – drums, percussion (since February 2014)
 Sorin Voinea – keyboards, programming, backing vocals (since May 2015)
 Nicu Patoi – electric and acoustic guitars (since August 2015)
 Narcis Tran-Korsar – acoustic and double-six guitars, vocals (since December 2018)
 Codruț Croitoru – lead vocals (since December 2020)
 Mircea Baniciu – lead vocals, acoustic guitar (February 2014–December 2020)
 Cristi Gram – electric and acoustic guitars (February 2014–August 2015)
 Vlady Cnejevici – keyboards, programming, backing vocals (February 2014–May 2015)
 Teo Boar – electric and acoustic guitars (February 2014–May 2015)

Discography 

 Pe Argeș în jos (On Argeș downstream) (promotional maxi-single, 2008) 1
 Legenda (The Legend) (promotional maxi-single, 2014)
 Călușandra (The Calusandra) (promotional EP, 2015)
 Legenda (The Legend) (studio album, 2016)
 Cavalcada (The Cavalcade) (studio album, 2021)

Note
 1 – Released as a maxi-single by Baniciu & Kappl, before the establishment of Pasărea Rock.

References

External links 

 Pasărea Rock on Discogs
 Pasărea Rock on YouTube
 Pasărea Rock on Facebook

Romanian rock music groups
Musical groups established in 2014
Rock music supergroups
2014 establishments in Romania